Kent Håvard Eriksen (born 29 May 1991) is a forer Norwegian footballer who plays as a striker.

Club career
Eriksen was born in Skarnes. He made his debut for Elverum in the 0–0 draw against Nybergsund on 14 April 2012. He scored his first goal for the club in the 2–2 draw against Fram Larvik on 21 April 2012.

Ahead of the 2012/2013 season, thanks to I-N-I Music & Sport Agency, Kent was invited for trials by Polish Ekstraklasa club Lechia Gdansk, but no contract was offered. Despite that, he managed to move up a tier, to Sandnes Ulf of Norwegian Premier League. He made his first-tier debut in March 2014 against Odd.
In the 2015 season he scored 7 league goals and 3 cup goals, 2016 season followed with a great season with 12 goals in the league and 5 in the cup a season that put Sandnes Ulf for qualification back to Tippeligaen after they got relegated in 2014.  After a great season for Sandnes Ulf in 2016 he signed another contract that last until December 2018. In the summer 2017 he was near to sign a deal with Bodo/Glimt but a last minute decline on a 2 million NOK bid on Eriksen left him no choice than to stay in Sandnes Ulf.

During the winter of 2018, Fk Haugesund wanted to buy him, but again the offer was declined by Sandnes Ulf and the captain stayed in Sandnes Ulf for the 2019 Season.

Career statistics

Club

References

 Altomfotball.no – Player Stats Kent Eriksen

1991 births
Living people
People from Sør-Odal
Norwegian footballers
Association football forwards
Bournemouth F.C. players
Elverum Fotball players
Sandnes Ulf players
Lillestrøm SK players
Norwegian Third Division players
Norwegian Second Division players
Norwegian First Division players
Eliteserien players
Norwegian expatriate footballers
Expatriate footballers in England
Norwegian expatriate sportspeople in England
Sportspeople from Innlandet